Gnorimoschema bodillum is a moth in the family Gelechiidae. It was described by Ole Karsholt and Ebbe Nielsen in 1974. It is found in Denmark, northern Germany and northern Russia (Taymyrsky Dolgano-Nenetsky District).

The larvae feed on Salix repens and Myrica gale. They feed on plants that have recently been sanded over but which are still alive and not completely covered. It lives there in spun sand tubes under the sand surface, where it develops a complicated system of galleries.

References

Gnorimoschema
Moths described in 1974